Joanne Marie Kiesanowski (born 24 May 1979)  is a New Zealand cyclist, who won the silver medal in the women's scratch race at the 2010 Commonwealth Games.  She is married to Jeff Pierce, a former professional cyclist.

The 2012 Summer Olympics was Kiesanowski's third Olympics, having already competed in the women's road race at the 2004 and 2008 Olympics.

Major results
2015
2nd Points Race, U.S. Vic Williams Memorial Grand Prix
3rd Scratch Race, Festival of Speed

References

External links 
 
 
 
 
 

1979 births
Living people
New Zealand female cyclists
Olympic cyclists of New Zealand
Cyclists at the 2012 Summer Olympics
Commonwealth Games silver medallists for New Zealand
Cyclists at the 2004 Summer Olympics
Cyclists at the 2008 Summer Olympics
Cyclists at the 2010 Commonwealth Games
Cyclists from Christchurch
Commonwealth Games medallists in cycling
21st-century New Zealand women
Medallists at the 2010 Commonwealth Games